Villa Falconieri is a 1928 German-Italian silent drama film directed by Richard Oswald and starring Maria Jacobini, Hans Stüwe, and Eve Gray. It was based on the 1896 novel of the same title by Richard Voss.

The film was shot at the Johannisthal Studios in Berlin and the Fert Studios in Berlin. Location shooting took place at the real Villa Falconieri outside Rome. The film's sets were designed by the art director Heinrich Richter. It premiered at the Ufa-Pavillon am Nollendorfplatz in Berlin on 20 September 1928, with the first Italian release taking place in March 1929.

Synopsis
A young count and poet rents the Villa Falconieri to be near to the Princess Sora with whom he believes himself in love. However while there he encounters the beautiful Maria Mariano and her brutish husband Vittorio.

Cast
 Maria Jacobini as Maria Mariano
 Hans Stüwe as Cola Graf Campana, Schriftsteller
 Eve Gray as Prinzessin Sora
 Clifford McLaglen as Vittorio Mariano
 Elena Sangro as Assunta Neri, Schauspielerin
 Joop van Hulzen as Belcampo, ein Dichterling
 Angelo Ferrari as Prinz Sora
 Oreste Bilancia as Daniele

References

External links

1929 films
German drama films
German silent feature films
Films of the Weimar Republic
Italian drama films
1929 drama films
Films directed by Richard Oswald
Films set in Italy
Films based on German novels
Italian silent feature films
German black-and-white films
Italian black-and-white films
Films shot at Johannisthal Studios
Films shot in Rome
Silent drama films
1920s German films
1920s Italian films